Reed Albergotti (born in Minneapolis) is an American journalist and the co-author of Wheelmen: Lance Armstrong, the Tour de France, and the Greatest Sports Conspiracy Ever. This non-fiction book co-written with Vanessa O'Connell was published by Gotham Books on October 15, 2013. He has written about law and sports, including the doping scandal in American cycling.

In 2008, Albergotti was one of a small group of journalists who helped found The Wall Street Journal sports page.

In 2010, Albergotti created the ongoing Wall Street Journal video series called The Olympics: How Hard Can it Be? In the series, Albergotti tried out Olympic sports including hockey and figure skating with American athletes like hockey goalie Martin Brodeur and gold medal-winning figure skater Sarah Hughes.

References

External links

Year of birth missing (living people)
Living people
21st-century American journalists
American male journalists
American sports journalists
Journalists from Minnesota
San Diego State University alumni
The Wall Street Journal people
Writers from Minneapolis